Plutomurus is a genus of springtails belonging to the family Tomoceridae.

Species:
 Plutomurus abchasicus
 Plutomurus baschkiricus
 Plutomurus ortobalaganensis

References

Collembola
Springtail genera